Kheyrabad (also Romanized as Kheyrābād) is a village in Dalaki Rural District, in the Central District of Dashtestan County, Bushehr Province, Iran. At the 2006 census, its population was 441, in 79 families.

References 

Populated places in Dashtestan County